All Sides may refer to:

 All Sides (O.A.R. album), 2008
 All Sides (LMNT album), 2002
 AllSides, a company that evaluates media bias
 All Sides with Ann Fisher, WOSU-FM talk show